Tommy Walker may refer to:

Sports
Tommy Walker (winger) (fl. 1891–1893), English footballer (Port Vale)
Tommy Walker (footballer, born 1903) (1903–?), Bradford City and Sheffield Wednesday footballer
Tommy Walker (footballer, born 1915) (1915–1993), Scottish international football player and manager (Hearts, Chelsea)
Tommy Walker (footballer, born 1923) (1923–2005), Newcastle United and Oldham Athletic footballer
Tommy Walker (footballer, born 1964), Scottish footballer for Ayr United, Dumbarton, Stranraer and Albion Rovers
Tommy Walker (footballer, born February 1952) (born 1952), Stoke City and Burnley midfielder
Tommy Walker (footballer, born March 1952) (born 1952), Scottish footballer (Airdrieonians)

Other
Tommy Walker (Australian politician) (1858–1932), in Western Australia
Tommy Walker (events director) (1922–1986), American producer of live events
Tommy Walker (worship leader), American composer and author
Tommy Walker (Brothers & Sisters), played by Balthazar Getty
Poltpalingada Booboorowie (died 1901), known as Tommy Walker, Aboriginal personality in Adelaide
 Tommy Walker (The Who), a fictional character from the album Tommy and also its related musical media and film

See also
Thomas Walker (disambiguation)